Blastobasis phaeopasta is a moth of the  family Blastobasidae. It is found in Australia, including northern Queensland. It was first described in 1947 by Alfred Jefferis Turner, and the species epithet, phaeopasta, describes it as being "darkly sprinkled".

References

External links
Australian Faunal Directory

Moths of Australia
phaeopasta
Moths described in 1947